mot was a German automotive magazine that was published from 1960 until 2006 by Motor Presse Stuttgart. It was a monthly magazine until 1963, thereafter it was released fortnightly. Right before the discontinuation it appeared monthly again.

The origins of the magazine lie with Rollerei und Mobil: Roller, Mobile, Kleinwagen und Mopeds. From 2005 until 2006 the magazine was renamed Motors.

Other than its sister publication Auto motor und sport,  mot emphasized the efficiency of tested vehicles. Apart from that, motorsport played only a secondary role.

References

External links

Automobile magazines published in Germany
Biweekly magazines published in Germany
German-language magazines
Magazines established in 1960
Magazines disestablished in 2006
Magazines published in Stuttgart
1960 establishments in West Germany
2006 disestablishments in Germany
Defunct magazines published in Germany